Haggai was a town in Saint Francois County, Missouri, United States, located between Doe Run and Iron Mountain.

History
It was formerly called "Hog-Eye" and retained that pronunciation. "This town was at one time of considerable importance," says a history of the county dating from 1935.

GNIS reference
The Geographic Names Information System has an entry for Haggai with a listed location of unknown.

References

Former populated places in St. Francois County, Missouri
Ghost towns in Missouri